Paul Bergen is an Olympic swimming coach from the United States. He has coached in the USA and Canada, winning coach of the year honors in both countries in different years. He was inducted into the International Swimming Hall of Fame as an Honor Coach in 1988. He has coached swimmers to 21 World, 24 USA and 13 Canadian records.

Among the athletes he has coached are: Deena Deardurff, Tracy Caulkins and Inge de Bruijn. He has coached with the Cincinnati Marlins in Ohio, Nashville Aquatic Club in Tennessee, the University of Texas, Tualatin Hills in Oregon, and Etobicoke in Ontario, Canada.

In 2010, Deena Deardurff revealed that Bergen had sexually abused her from the time she was 11 until she stopped his abuse at the age of 15.  As a result of Deardurff's revelations, Tulatin Hills Swim Club removed Bergen's name from its premier swimming event in 2013.

He served on USA coaching staffs to World Championships in 1975, 1978 and 1982, and with Canada in 1986. He was an Olympic coach in 1980, 1984, 1988 and 2000.

See also
 List of members of the International Swimming Hall of Fame

References

External links

American swimming coaches
Year of birth missing (living people)
Living people